Selmer is a town in and the county seat of McNairy County, Tennessee, in the southwestern part of the state. The population was 4,396 at the 2010 census and estimated at 4,400 at the 2018 census. It is named after Selma, Alabama.

Buford Pusser served as the sheriff of McNairy County from 1964 to 1970.

History

County seat

In 1890,  the county seat of McNairy County was moved from Purdy to Selmer.

Buford Pusser
Sheriff Buford Pusser served as the sheriff of McNairy County from 1964 to 1970, and since Selmer is the county seat, the location of the courthouse and the jail, this was his base of operations. His story has been made famous in the Walking Tall movies starring Joe Don Baker and Bo Svenson. The movies were filmed in nearby Henderson.

Newspaper
The oldest existing business in McNairy County is its newspaper, the Independent Appeal, which was founded in 1902. It is located at 111 N. 2nd St. in Selmer. The fourth largest circulation of a weekly newspaper in the state, with an average weekly circulation of 7,200-7,400 and a readership of more than 17,000.

The McNairy County News began publication in 2009. The MCN is located at 252 Mulberry Avenue in Selmer. The paper has an online presence at mcnairycountynews.com and a Facebook page, as well as a weekly printed publication each Thursday.

Geography
Selmer is located at  (35.172333, -88.592964).

Robert Sibley Airport
The current manager of Robert Sibley Airport is Chris Tull.

Demographics

2020 census

As of the 2020 United States census, there were 4,446 people, 1,669 households, and 1,104 families residing in the town.

2000 census
As of the census of 2000, there were 4,541 people, 1,935 households, and 1,234 families residing in the town. The population density was 464.5 people per square mile (179.3/km2). There were 2,173 housing units at an average density of 222.3 per square mile (85.8/km2). The racial makeup of the town was 81.61% White, 15.92% African American, 0.22% Native American, 0.26% Asian, 0.37% from other races, and 1.61% from two or more races. Hispanic or Latino of any race were 1.54% of the population.

There were 1,935 households, out of which 26.7% had children under the age of 18 living with them, 47.7% were married couples living together, 13.1% had a female householder with no husband present, and 36.2% were non-families. 32.5% of all households were made up of individuals, and 16.1% had someone living alone who was 65 years of age or older. The average household size was 2.22 and the average family size was 2.80.

In the town, the population was spread out, with 21.3% under the age of 18, 7.8% from 18 to 24, 25.9% from 25 to 44, 25.2% from 45 to 64, and 19.8% who were 65 years of age or older. The median age was 41 years. For every 100 females, there were 86.4 males. For every 100 females age 18 and over, there were 82.0 males.

The median income for a household in the town was $28,494, and the median income for a family was $38,313. Males had a median income of $31,176 versus $21,989 for females. The per capita income for the town was $21,350. About 10.9% of families and 16.6% of the population were below the poverty line, including 19.0% of those under age 18 and 19.9% of those age 65 or over.

Major highways
The major highways U.S. Route 64 (east-west), and U.S. Route 45 (north-south) intersect in this town, making it an important crossroads. In 2009 the Tennessee Legislature designated Highway 45 South, between Interstate 40 and the Mississippi state line, Rockabilly Highway in recognition of the region's contributions to the development of rockabilly music.

Railroad
The railroad that runs through this small town is owned by Class 1 railroad, Norfolk Southern.

Climate

National media attention

Matthew Winkler homicide, 2006
Selmer became a focus of national news media in late March 2006. A local minister, Matthew Brian Winkler, was shot to death by his wife Mary Carol Winkler at their Selmer home. After Mary was said to have fled Selmer with the couple's three daughters, she was apprehended in Orange Beach, Alabama, and was returned to Selmer for trial. She has confessed to the authorities concerning the shooting of her husband with a shotgun. In trial she stated that her husband both physically and emotionally abused her.  This murder/trial can be seen on the television show 'Snapped' Season 6 Episode 1, aired in 2007.

Drag racing catastrophe, 2007
On June 16, 2007, a high-power Pro Modified drag racing car driven by Troy Warren Critchley lost control and killed six young people while performing a burnout routine during a car show charity parade on Mulberry Avenue. Critchley's car left the road and struck part of the crowd attending the Cars For Kids charity parade. Six young people were killed. Two died at the scene of the accident, and four died later at hospitals in Selmer, Jackson and Memphis. A total of 20 others were injured and were transported to various hospitals throughout western and middle Tennessee. Results of a Tennessee Highway Patrol inquiry into the accident have not been announced. Pending lawsuits filed against the city and event organizers ask for more than $US 85 million in damages.

On March 4, 2008, the McNairy County grand jury returned an indictment against Critchley on six counts of vehicular homicide due to recklessness, a Class C felony, and 22 counts of reckless aggravated assault, a Class D felony. Neither Cars for Kids nor the City of Selmer were named in the indictment.

On March 20, 2008, Troy Critchley surrendered to authorities and was booked on the charges, with bond set at $35,000. The trial was set for November 3, 2008.

Troy Critchley pleaded guilty to 28 charges of reckless assault and was sentenced to 18 months' probation.

Radio broadcasting

FM stations
WXKV 90.5 Contemporary Christian
WWGM 93.9 Mix

AM station
WDTM 1150 Southern Gospel

Education 
Selmer is served by:

 Selmer Elementary
 There is an active police and CPS investigation into allegations of abuse in Pre-Kindergarten, Kindergarten and First grades at Selmer Elementary.
 Selmer Middle School
 McNairy Central High School (Home of the Bobcats)
 University of Tennessee at Martin satellite campus

Notable people
 Ray Bodiford, Tennessee politician
 Chad Harville, baseball pitcher

References

External links

 
 

1901 establishments in Tennessee
County seats in Tennessee
Populated places established in 1901
Towns in McNairy County, Tennessee
Towns in Tennessee